Finlay Brown may refer to:

Finlay Brown (footballer) (1902–1977), Scottish footballer
Finlay Brown (rugby union), Scottish rugby union referee